Aparna may refer to:

One of the names of the Hindu goddess Parvati

People 
Aparna Bajpai, Indian actress
Aparna Balamurali, Indian actress and singer
Aparna Balan (born 1986), Indian badminton player
Aparna Brielle (born 1994), American actress
Aparna Chandra (born 1971), Indian fashion designer
Aparna Dixit (born 1991), Indian television actress
Aparna Ghosh, Bangladeshi actress
Aparna Gopinath, Malayalam film actress
Aparna Dutta Gupta, Indian biologist
Aparna Higgins, Indian-American mathematician
Aparna V. Huzurbazar, American statistician
Aparna Jain (born 1970), Indian marketing consultant and author
Aparna Karthikeyan, Indian journalist and author
Aparna Kumar, Indian mountain climber
Aparna B. Marar, Indian classical dancer
Aparna Nagesh, Indian dancer and activist
Aparna Nair (born 1989), Malayalam film actress
Aparna Nancherla (born 1982), American comedian and actress
Aparna Panshikar, Indian classical singer and composer
Aparna Pillai, Tamil film actress
Aparna Popat (born 1978), Indian badminton player
Aparna Raina, Indian production designer
Aparna Rao (1950–2005), German anthropologist
Aparna Sen (born 1945), Indian actress and filmmaker
Aparna Sindhoor, Indian-American choreographer and dancer
Aparna Vinod (born 1996), Indian actress
Aparna (television presenter), full name Aparna Vastarey, Indian actress and television presenter
Aparna, character on the television series Insecure

Films 
 Aparna (1972 film), starring Tanuja
Aparna (1981 film), Malayalam film released in 1981 directed by CP Padmakumar
 Aparna (1989 film), an unreleased Malayalam-language film
Aparna (1993 film), Malayalam film released in 1993 directed by PK Radhakrishnan

See also
 

Indian feminine given names